Ivan Knezović (born 25 September 1982 in Split) is a retired Croatian football defender.

Honours
Slovenian PrvaLiga: 2006–07, 2007–08
Slovenian Supercup: 2007

External links
 
Ivan Knezović profile at NZS 

1982 births
Living people
Footballers from Split, Croatia
Association football defenders
Croatian footballers
HNK Hajduk Split players
NK Solin players
FK Sloboda Tuzla players
FC Koper players
NK Domžale players
NK Rudar Velenje players
Premier League of Bosnia and Herzegovina players
Slovenian PrvaLiga players
Croatian expatriate footballers
Expatriate footballers in Bosnia and Herzegovina
Croatian expatriate sportspeople in Bosnia and Herzegovina
Expatriate footballers in Slovenia
Croatian expatriate sportspeople in Slovenia